The West Indies cricket team toured Australia from 29 January 2013 to 13 February 2013. The tour consisted of five One Day Internationals (ODI's) and a single Twenty20 International (T20I's). These matches were preceded by a match featuring the Prime Minister's XI and the West Indians.

Squads

Tour matches

ODI series

1st ODI

2nd ODI

3rd ODI

4th ODI

5th ODI

Twenty20 series

Only T20I

Statistics

Australia

ODI's
James Faulkner took his first ODI wicket when he dismissed Devon Thomas in the 1st ODI.
Mitchell Starc took his second ODI 5-wicket haul in the 1st ODI.
George Bailey scored his maiden international century in the 2nd ODI.
Adam Voges scored his maiden international century in the 5th ODI.

T20I's

West Indies

ODI's
Jason Holder took his first ODI wicket when he dismissed Aaron Finch in the 1st ODI.

T20I's

Broadcasters

References

2012 in cricket
2012 in Australian cricket
2013 in cricket
2013 in Australian cricket
2012–13 Australian cricket season
2012-13
International cricket competitions in 2012–13